The 2013–2014 MRF Challenge Formula 2000 Championship was the second running of the MRF Challenge Formula 2000 Championship. The series consisted of 13 races, spread across 4 meetings began on 26 October 2013 at the Buddh International Circuit, supporting the 2013 Indian Grand Prix and ended on 16 February 2014.

Rupert Svendsen-Cook claimed the championship title, after successfully appealing a penalty that was given to him, at the final round of the season at the Madras Motor Racing Track. Svendsen-Cook had been given a 30-second penalty for pushing Tio Ellinas off the track, which had allowed Ellinas to provisionally claim the championship title. This penalty was overturned in March, allowing Svendsen-Cook's advantage of two points to stand.

Drivers

Race calendar and results

Championship standings

Scoring system

 Reverse grid Race

Drivers' standings

References

Further reading 
 , MRF Limited. Retrieved on 21 March 2014.
 , MRF Limited, Delhi, 16 February 2014. Retrieved on 21 March 2014.
 , Madras Motor Sports Club, Chennai, 10 February 2013. Retrieved on 21 March 2014.

External links 

 

2013–2014
MRF Challenge
MRF Challenge
MRF Challenge
MRF Challenge